Sweet is an Anglo-Saxon surname. Notable people with the surname include :
 Alec Stone Sweet, Yale Law School professor, musician and pétanque player
 Alanson Sweet (1804–1891), American businessman and politician
 Apollo Sweet (born 1957), Samoan/Australian boxer of the 1980s and '90s
 Blanche Sweet (1896–1986), silent film actress
 Brad Sweet (born 1985), American race car driver
 Burton E. Sweet (1867–1957), American politician from Iowa
 Darrell Sweet (musician) (1947–1999), co-founder and drummer of the band Nazareth
 Darrell K. Sweet (1934–2011),  American illustrator
 David Sweet (disambiguation)
 Denise Sweet, Native American poet and academic, appointed Poet Laureate of Wisconsin in 2004
 Dolph Sweet (1920–1985), American actor
 Don Sweet (born 1948), former Canadian Football League kicker
 Elnathan Sweet (1837–1903),  New York State Engineer and Surveyor 1884–1887
 Edwin F. Sweet (1847–1935), U.S. Representative from Michigan
 Gary Sweet (born 1957),  Australian film and television actor
 George Sweet (1844–1920), English-born Australian geologist
 George Sweet (football manager) (1897–1969), Scottish football manager
 Henry Sweet (1845–1912), English philologist, phonetician and grammarian
 Herbert J. Sweet (1919–1998), United States Marine Corps official
 John Sweet (disambiguation)
 Jonathan Sweet, Australian actor
 Leonard Sweet (born 1961), American author, preacher, and United Methodist clergyman
 Lynn Sweet (born 1961), American journalist and columnist
 Lynn Sweet (American football) (1881–1918), American football player
 Matthew Sweet (born 1964), American alternative rock musician
 Melissa Sweet, Australian human health and medicine journalist
 Melissa Sweet (born 1956), American children's illustrator who won the 2012 Sibert Medal
 Michael Sweet (disambiguation)
 Ossian Sweet (1895–1960), African-American physician charged with, but not convicted of, murder for defending himself against a white mob
 Rachel Sweet (born 1962), American singer, writer and actress
 Robert Sweet (disambiguation)
 Samuel Sweet (1825–1886), English-Australian settler and photographer
 Sylvanus H. Sweet (1830–1899), New York State Engineer and Surveyor 1874–1875
 Thaddeus C. Sweet (1872–1928), American politician from  New York politician
 Walter C. Sweet (born 1927), American paleontologist
 William Sweet (disambiguation)
 Willis Sweet (1856–1925), American politician from Idaho

Surnames from nicknames